Mostafa Abdel-Satar is an Egyptian footballer who plays as a goalkeeper for Egyptian Premier League side Banha.

Living people
Egyptian footballers
Association football goalkeepers
Zamalek SC players
Year of birth missing (living people)